The 1979 Tufts Jumbos football team was an American football team that represented Tufts University in the New England Small College Athletic Conference (NESCAC) during the 1979 NCAA Division III football season. In their second season under head coach Vic Gatto, the Jumbos compiled a perfect 8–0 record and won the NESCAC championship. It was the first Tufts team to record a perfect season since 1934. The team played its home games at the Frederick M. Ellis Oval in Somerville, Massachusetts. Key players included quarterback Chris Connors.

Schedule

References

Tufts
Tufts Jumbos football seasons
College football undefeated seasons
Tufts Jumbos football